Pseudoneptis is a butterfly genus in the family Nymphalidae. It contains only one species Pseudoneptis bugandensis, the blue sailer or blue sergeant. It is found in Guinea, Sierra Leone, Liberia, Ivory Coast, Ghana, Togo, Nigeria, Cameroon, the Republic of the Congo, the Central African Republic, Angola, the Democratic Republic of the Congo, Uganda, Kenya, Sudan, Tanzania and Zambia. The habitat consists of forest with a canopy, including dry and disturbed forests.

The larvae possibly feed on Antiaris toxicaria, Ritchiea capparioides, Antiaris africana and Ficus species (including F. asperifolia).

Subspecies
Pseudoneptis bugandensis bugandensis (eastern Uganda, western Kenya, southern Sudan, north-western Tanzania)
Pseudoneptis bugandensis ianthe Hemming, 1964 (Guinea, Sierra Leone, Liberia, Ivory Coast, Ghana, Togo, Nigeria, Cameroon, Congo, Central African Republic, Angola, Democratic Republic of the Congo, western Uganda, Zambia)

References

Limenitidinae
Monotypic butterfly genera
Taxa named by Pieter Cornelius Tobias Snellen
Nymphalidae genera